Alan Robert Murray (July 30, 1954 – February 24, 2021) was an American sound editor.

Murray was nominated for ten Academy Awards. In 2007, Murray won the Academy Award for Best Sound Editing for his work on Letters from Iwo Jima (2005). In 2015, Murray won his second Academy Award for Best Sound Editing for his work on American Sniper (2014). He shared both awards with Bub Asman. Murray earned his tenth nomination at the 92nd Academy Awards for Best Sound Editing for Joker, setting record for the Sound Editing category. He died in Los Angeles on February 24, 2021, at age 66.

Academy Awards
With ten nominations, Alan Robert Murray has set a record for becoming the most-nominated sound editor for the Academy Award for Best Sound Editing category, surpassed Richard Hymns with nine nominations.

References

External links
 

1954 births
2021 deaths
Best Sound Editing Academy Award winners
Place of birth missing
Place of death missing
American sound editors
American film editors